The 1997 Internationaux de Strasbourg was a women's tennis tournament played on outdoor clay courts in Strasbourg, France that was part of Tier III of the 1997 WTA Tour. It was the eleventh edition of the tournament and was held from May 19 through May 24, 1997. First-seeded Steffi Graf, who competed on a wildcard, won the singles title.

Finals

Singles

 Steffi Graf defeated  Mirjana Lučić 6–2, 7–5
 It was Graf's 1st title of the year and the 114th of her career.

Doubles

 Helena Suková /  Natasha Zvereva defeated  Elena Likhovtseva /  Ai Sugiyama 6–1, 6–1
 It was Suková's 1st title of the year and the 80th of her career. It was Zvereva's 5th title of the year and the 67th of her career.

References

External links
 IT tournament edition details 
 Tournament draws

Internationaux de Strasbourg
1997
Internationaux de Strasbourg
Internationaux de Strasbourg